Brawl Brothers, known in Japan as , is a side-scrolling beat 'em up game developed and published by Jaleco for the Super Nintendo Entertainment System in 1992. It is the second game in the Rushing Beat series, after Rival Turf!, and was followed by The Peace Keepers in 1993.

Gameplay
As in Final Fight, the player has to walk sideways and fight bad guys for several stages. Next to the general food-health supplies, the player can also pick up weapons like sticks, guns, grenades and such. A special "Angry Mode" gives injured fighters a burst of energy.

It is the only known SNES game that features its Japanese version on the same cartridge, accessible through use of a cheat code. The Japanese version of the game features different character names, no maze-like stages, an expanded ending sequence and the addition of a groin kick move for playable character Douglas Bild.

Characters
The player can choose from one of five characters, with American and Japanese version names:
Hack / Rick Norton, the street brawler. Compared to Rival Turf!, Norton is more imposing and one of his throws is a deadly German suplex. He now wears bandages around his pants' lower legs to protect his shins. His boss stage is a platform surrounded by a steel cage.
Slash / Douglas Bild, the police officer, who has gained more size as well and wears yellow boots that also go up to half his calf. He can no longer do a Frankensteiner, but his power bomb is much stronger. His alternate throw is an Atomic Drop from the back. In the Japanese version it is an Atomic Drop from the front, which is a direct shot to the groin, which was censored by Nintendo of America. His boss stage is a construction platform that is raised and lowered as the battle goes on.

The new characters aiding them are these:
Lord J, the judo master, slow and lumbering but with powerful throws. His boss stage is a temple court;
Kazan, the ninja, very quick and able to split himself in half to slash foes. His boss stage is a ninja dojo training room and has spikes on the floors which become walls as the room rotates;
Wendy Milan, the professional wrestler, rather quick for the powerful moves she can execute. Her boss stage is a conventional wrestling ring whose ropes she can jump on to execute flying attacks.

In a one-player game, a "partner" will chosen for the player at random by the CPU. The remaining characters thereafter (or clones of them per the Japanese storyline) will be chosen as bosses for the first three levels. The remaining level ends with a battle against the final boss, Dieter/Iceman, a martial artist with an extendable and flexible staff.

Reception

Nintendo Magazine System called it an "outstanding beat' em up which suffers on a few minor accounts" with an overall score of 84%. AllGame gave a rating of 3 out of 5 stars, praising the graphics, music, and addition of more enemies and moves than the original game. Criticism included the lack of speed, precision, and polish compared to games like Streets of Rage, Double Dragon, and Street Fighter II. Power Unlimited gave a review score of 75% writing: "Brawl Brothers graphics are excellent. They almost match the graphics of the arcade games of 1993. The gameplay may be a bit less, but it's still a great game."

References

External links
Rushing Beat Ran at Jaleco 
Brawl Brothers at GameFAQs

1992 video games
Jaleco beat 'em ups
Cooperative video games
Video games about ninja
Video games about police officers
Side-scrolling beat 'em ups
Super Nintendo Entertainment System games
Video games developed in Japan
Video games featuring female protagonists
Virtual Console games
Virtual Console games for Wii U
Nintendo Switch Online games
Multiplayer and single-player video games